Slapton may refer to the following places in the United Kingdom:

 Slapton, Buckinghamshire, a village and civil parish
 Slapton, Devon, a village and civil parish
 Slapton, Northamptonshire, a village

See also
 Slapton Castle, an Iron Age hill fort near Slapton, Devon
 Slapton Ley, a lake on the south coast of Devon
 Slipton, Northamptonshire, a village